Adeloneivaia is a genus of moths in the family Saturniidae first described by Travassos in 1940.

Species
Adeloneivaia acuta (Schaus, 1896)
Adeloneivaia bellardi (Schaus, 1928)
Adeloneivaia boisduvalii (Doumet, 1859)
Adeloneivaia catharina (Bouvier, 1927)
Adeloneivaia catoxantha (W. Rothschild, 1907)
Adeloneivaia fallax (Boisduval, 1872)
Adeloneivaia irrorata (Schaus, 1900)
Adeloneivaia isara (Dognin, 1905)
Adeloneivaia jason (Boisduval, 1872)
Adeloneivaia minuta (Bouvier, 1927)
Adeloneivaia pelias (W. Rothschild, 1907)
Adeloneivaia sabulosa (W. Rothschild, 1907)
Adeloneivaia schubarti Rego Barros & Mielke, 1970
Adeloneivaia subangulata (Herrich-Schaeffer, 1855)
Adeloneivaia wellingi Lemaire, 1982

References

Ceratocampinae
Moth genera